Indiaplaza was an Indian electronic commerce website. It was one of the pioneers in the online shopping space in India. Earlier known as Fabmart and then Fabmall, the company later acquired US-based online shopping firm Indiaplaza.com and rebranded itself as Indiaplaza.in in India, and as Indiaplaza.com in the United States, which were later merged into a single website.

History
In June 1999, K Vaitheeswaran and five of his friends including V S Sudhakar, Vipul Parekh, Hari Menon, V S Ramesh and Sundeep Thakran founded India's first online departmental store. The website Fabmart.com was launched in September 1999 which then offered only music CDs for sale. Between February and October 2000, the website introduced additional categories including books, movies, watches, and groceries.  In February 2002, they launched their first offline grocery store in Bangalore, India.

Funding
Indiaplaza.com received angel funding from The Indigo Monsoon Group (IMG), a private investment firm based in the USA known for investing in Indian Internet and mobile domains. IMG's other investments include Sulekha.com, a leading online community for Indians integrating social media with local commerce, and EShakti.com, a leading online India-inspired and customized apparel retailer aimed at a global audience. In February 2011, Indiaplaza successfully concluded a deal for Series A US $5 million funding from Indo-US Venture Partners (IUVP) who had previously invested in other internet companies like Myntra, and Snapdeal.

Despite securing these funding sources, Indiaplaza was unable to raise sufficient funding in 2012–2013, which meant that the company had to cease trading.

Product range
Indiaplaza offered a few thousand  products online including books, CD-ROMs, cameras, mobile phones, apparel, jewelry, flowers, chocolates, watches, and food items.

Indiaplaza Golden Quill Book Award
The "Indiaplaza Golden Quill Book Awards" were instituted by Indiaplaza in 2008, to be conferred to an Indian author domiciled in India. The award was for an original full-length novel or work of fiction in English or a translation into English of an original full-length novel or work of fiction of any Indian language published in India in the previous calendar year.

See also
E-commerce
Online shopping
Electronic business

References

External links
 Defunct official website

Internet properties established in 1999
Online retailers of India
1999 establishments in India